South Sixth Street Historic District is a national historic district located at Poplar Bluff, Butler County, Missouri.  It encompasses four contributing buildings and two contributing structures in a residential section of Poplar Bluff.  The district developed between about 1880 and 1917, and includes representative examples of Italianate and Colonial Revival style architecture.  Notable buildings include the Luke F. Quinn House (1884), the Warren S. Randall House (1889), and John C. Corrigan House (1917).

It was added to the National Register of Historic Places in 1998.

References

Historic districts on the National Register of Historic Places in Missouri
Houses on the National Register of Historic Places in Missouri
Italianate architecture in Missouri
Colonial Revival architecture in Missouri
Buildings and structures in Butler County, Missouri
National Register of Historic Places in Butler County, Missouri